Choi Myeong-jong (born 6 May 1933) is a South Korean wrestler. He competed in the men's freestyle welterweight at the 1960 Summer Olympics.

References

External links
 

1933 births
Living people
South Korean male sport wrestlers
Olympic wrestlers of South Korea
Wrestlers at the 1960 Summer Olympics
Sport wrestlers from Seoul
Wrestlers at the 1958 Asian Games
Asian Games competitors for South Korea
20th-century South Korean people